Lindenwood Cemetery is a rural cemetery operated by Dignity Memorial in Fort Wayne, Indiana, established in 1859. With over 74,000 graves and covering , it is one of the largest cemeteries in Indiana.

Famous interments include some of the most important political figures from Fort Wayne history including Samuel Hanna (1797–
1866), Jesse L. Williams (1807–1886), Allen Hamilton (1798–1864), Colonel George W. Ewing (1804–1866), Paul Frank Baer (1893–1930), Daisy E. Nirdlinger (1879–1950) and Arthur "Art" Roy Smith (1890–1926).

Isaac De Groff Nelson helped to incorporate Lindenwood Cemetery, where a monument was built to him.

Lindenwood was placed on the National Register of Historic Places on February 17, 1978.

References

External links
 
 History – Lindenwood Cemetery at Dignity Memorial
 

Cemeteries on the National Register of Historic Places in Indiana
Romanesque Revival architecture in Indiana
1859 establishments in Indiana
National Register of Historic Places in Fort Wayne, Indiana
Rural cemeteries